Final Battle 2006 was the 5th Final Battle major professional wrestling event produced by Ring of Honor (ROH). It took place on December 23, 2006 from the Manhattan Center in New York City.

It was the fourth annual event in the Final Battle chronology, with the first taking place in 2002.

The shows main event featured New York’s own Homicide challenge Bryan Danielson for the ROH World Championship, with Homicide vowing to leave ROH forever if he failed to win the title.

Background 
Final Battle featured seven professional wrestling matches that involved different wrestlers from pre-existing scripted feuds and storylines. Wrestlers were portrayed as either villains or heroes in the scripted events that built tension and culminated in a wrestling match.

Results

See also
List of Ring of Honor pay-per-view events

References

External links 
 

2006 in professional wrestling
2006 in New York City
Events in New York City
2006
Professional wrestling in New York City